The London Chorus is an amateur choir, under the musical direction of Ronald Corp.  It was founded in 1903 by Arthur Fagge as the London Choral Society. Its first concert was a performance of Sullivan's The Golden Legend in October 1903. The following February the choir gave the second London performance of Elgar's The Dream of Gerontius.

In October 2000, the choir changed its name to The London Chorus, performing its inaugural concert, Delius's A Mass of Life, at the Royal Festival Hall.

Comprising around 130 members, the choir rehearses on Tuesday nights at Baden-Powell House in South Kensington, London.   As well as promoting its own concerts, The London Chorus works with major orchestras and promoters, both in London and abroad.

Notes

References

External links 
 http://www.londonchorus.org.uk

London choirs
Musical groups established in 1903
1903 establishments in England